Within the human brain, the superficial veins of the brain are those veins that are close to the surface of the brain. They consist of a superior group that empties into the superior sagittal sinus and inferior sagittal sinus, and an inferior group which empties into the transverse sinuses and the cavernous sinuses.

References

Veins of the head and neck